Chromosome 16 open reading frame 95 (C16orf95) is a gene which in humans encodes the protein C16orf95. It has orthologs in mammals, and is expressed at a low level in many tissues. C16orf95 evolves quickly compared to other proteins.

Gene 
C16orf95 is a Homo sapiens gene oriented on the minus strand of chromosome 16. It is located on the cytogenic band 16q24.2 and spans 14.62 kilobases. The gene contains 6 introns and 7 exons.

Homology

Paralogs 
There are no known paralogs of C16orf95.

Orthologs 
Orthologs of C16orf95 exist only in mammals (identified with BLAST). The most distant orthologs are found in opossums and Tasmanian devils.

mRNA

Alternative splicing 
There are three splice variants of C16orf95. The longest transcript contains 1156 base pairs and 7 exons. Compared to variant 1, the second transcript variant lacks exons 4 and 5. This alternative splicing results in a frameshift of the 3' coding region, and a shorter, unique C-terminus. The third transcript variant lacks exons 4 and 5, and uses an alternate 5' exon and start codon. The resulting peptide has unique N- and C-termini compared to variant 1.

Secondary structure 
The 3' untranslated region of the C16orf95 mRNA contains binding sites for KH domain-containing, RNA-binding, signal transduction-associated protein 3 (KHDRBS3) within an internal loop structure. KHDRBS3 regulates mRNA splicing and may act as a negative regulator of cell growth.

Expression 
The expression of C16orf95 is not well characterized. However, it has been detected at low levels in the following tissue types: bone, brain, ear, eye, intestine, kidney, lung, lymph nodes, prostate, testes, tonsils, skin, and uterus.

Protein

Structure

Primary 
The longest isoform of the C16orf95 protein has 239 amino acids. It has a conserved domain of unknown function spanning residues 76 to 239. C16orf95 has a calculated molecular weight of 26.5 kDa, and a predicted isoelectric point of 9.8. Compared to other human proteins, C16orf95 has more cysteine, arginine, and glutamine residues. It has fewer aspartate, glutamate, and asparagine. The high ratio of basic to acidic amino acids contributes to the protein's higher isoelectric point.

Secondary 
C16orf95 is predicted to have several alpha-helices in its C-terminus. This is true for the human and mouse proteins. The N-terminus does not have significant cross-program consensus for secondary structure.

Post-translational modifications 
The tools available at ExPASy were used to predict post-translational modification sites on C16orf95. The following modifications are predicted: palmitoylation, phosphorylation, and O-linked glycosylation. Bolded residues in the table indicate sites that are conserved in more than one species.

Evolution 
C16orf95 has a large number of amino acid changes over time, indicating it is a quickly evolving protein.

Interacting proteins 
There are no proteins known to interact with C16orf95.

Clinical significance 
Deletions of C16orf95 have been associated with hydronephrosis, microcephaly, distichiasis, vesicoureteral reflux, and intellectual impairment. However, the deletions included coding regions of the following genes: F-box Protein 31 (FBXO31), Microtubule-Associated Protein 1 Light Chain 3 Beta (MAP1LC3B), and Zinc Finger CCHC Type 14 (ZCCHC14). The contributions of each of these genes to the observed phenotypes has yet to be scientifically determined.

References 

Genes on human chromosome 16
Human proteins